Rita Elie Hayek (born 9 October 1987 in Beirut) is a Lebanese actress and television presenter.

Biography

Hayek studied acting at the Institut National des Beaux Arts (National Institute Of Fine Arts or INBA), at the Lebanese University. In 2011, she took acting courses at the Stella Adler Studio of Acting in Hollywood.

Hayek had her first television role in 2005, starring in the drama series A March Dream. A March Dream was a drama production portraying the contemporary events of 2005.

She has been selected to star in a play called High Heels, which portrays social dynamics in a way that is unusual in the region.

In 2017 Hayek starred in The Insult as the wife of the main character. The film was nominated for an Academy Award as Best Foreign Language Film of the Year 2018 and won several prizes at international film festivals.

References 

1987 births
Living people
Lebanese television actresses
Lebanese television presenters
Lebanese women television presenters
Actresses from Beirut
Lebanese University alumni
Lebanese Christians